Rigoberto Rivero (born 25 April 1914) was a Venezuelan sports shooter. He competed in the 300 m rifle, three positions event at the 1952 Summer Olympics.

References

External links
 

1914 births
Year of death missing
Venezuelan male sport shooters
Olympic shooters of Venezuela
Shooters at the 1952 Summer Olympics
Pan American Games bronze medalists for Venezuela
Pan American Games medalists in shooting
Place of birth missing
Shooters at the 1955 Pan American Games
20th-century Venezuelan people